Medvedyorovo is a rural locality (a selo) in Akhmetovsky Selsoviet, Kushnarenkovsky District, Bashkortostan, Russia. The population was 90 as of 2010. There are 3 streets.

Geography 
Medvedyorovo is located 24 km southeast of Kushnarenkovo (the district's administrative centre) by road. Kuvykovo is the nearest rural locality.

References 

Rural localities in Kushnarenkovsky District